The Zenith Z-6 is a single engine biplane U.S. airliner built in the late 1920s. Its cabin, in the fuselage immediately behind its radial engine, holds five or six passengers depending on engine power. It is flown from an open cockpit further aft. Nine were completed and one has been restored to flight.

Design and development

The first Zenith Z-6, a five passenger product of Zenith Aircraft based in Santa Ana, CA, first flew in 1927. After serious commercial confusion with another Zenith Aircraft, based in Uniontown, PA, the west coast company changed its name in 1928 to Albatross Aircraft. Hence  both the Z-6 and their later, trimotor Z-12 have been referred to as Zenith Albatross Z-6 and Zenith Albatross Z-12 or Albatross Z-12.

Its unequal span, single bay wings are rectangular in plan out to rounded tips and are mounted with strong  stagger. There is dihedral only on the lower wing. The wings have spruce box spars  and  ribs and are fabric covered. The upper and lower wings are braced together with N-form interplane struts between the spars and four short, near vertical cabane struts hold the upper wing over the fuselage.  There are externally interconnected, inset ailerons on both upper and lower wings.

The Z-6 has a fabric-covered steel tube fuselage and tail, with its nine cylinder radial engine in the nose. Two different engines were fitted: the original Z-6 had a  Wright J-5 and carried five passengers but both the Z-6-A and the Z-6-B have  Pratt & Whitney Wasp Cs, carrying six passengers. Some engines were uncowled, some had short-chord Townend ring-type  cowlings and one Z-6-B had a long chord, NACA cowling. The cabin was between the wings immediately behind the engine and was illuminated with long, continuous windows; the pilot's open cockpit was above and behind it. Its blunted triangular plan tailplane was mounted on top of the fuselage and carried more rounded, separated elevators. A cropped, triangular profile fin carried a blunted rectangular balanced rudder.

The steel tube, fixed landing gear was of the split axle type. The axle's inner ends were hinged on a short longitudinal member held just below the fuselage as were the rear drag struts. Z-6-B users could choose between two shock-absorbing systems with either conventional inward-leaning Bendix oleo struts, extended to the upper fuselage longerons, or Goodyear Airwheels, large, low pressure balloon tyres more suitable for soft strips.

Operational history

Though exact dates are not known, the original Z-6 first flew in 1927, the Z-6-A in 1928 and the Z-6-B in 1929. The histories of most of the nine examples built are not known but one Z-6-A was used by Bennett Air Lines in the Idaho region. It was later fitted with a fibreglass hopper for crop dusting then restored and is the only Z-6 still flying. It is part of the collection of the Maryland Heights-based Historic Aircraft Restoration Museum. The other Z-6-A  was later fitted with a supercharged  Pratt & Whitney Wasp SC.

Variants
Data from Aerofiles:Zenith
Z-6  Wright J-5. Span 
Z-6-A  Pratt & Whitney Wasp C. Span 
Z-6-B  Pratt & Whitney Wasp C. Span

Specifications (Zenith Z-6-B)

References

Biplanes
Single-engined tractor aircraft
1920s United States airliners